The 2011 Las Vegas mayoral election took place on June 7, 2011. Incumbent Mayor Oscar Goodman was ineligible to run for a fourth term due to term limits. The election was won by Carolyn Goodman.

Candidates
 Carolyn Goodman Incumbent
 Steven D. Ross Mayor Pro Tem of Las Vegas
 Larry Brown, Clark County Commissioner
 Chris Giunchigliani, Clark County Commissioner
 Victor Chaltiel	
 George Harris

First round

Runoff

References

Mayoral elections in Las Vegas
2011 Nevada elections
Las Vegas